Daedalochila auriculata is a species of air-breathing land snails, a terrestrial pulmonate gastropod mollusks in the family  Polygyridae.

References

Polygyridae